Samuel Jackson, nicknamed "Buster", was an American Negro league pitcher in the 1920s.

Jackson played for the Memphis Red Sox in 1928. In five recorded appearances on the mound, he posted a 3.60 ERA over 20 innings.

References

External links
 and Seamheads

Year of birth missing
Year of death missing
Place of birth missing
Place of death missing
Memphis Red Sox players
Baseball pitchers